Man vs. Wild is a television series on Discovery Channel in the United States, Australia, New Zealand, Canada, Brazil, India and Europe. The show is called Born Survivor in parts of Europe, including the UK, where it was originally broadcast by Channel 4, but latterly moved to Discovery Channel UK. In Africa, Asia and eastern parts of Europe, it is titled Ultimate Survival and also broadcast by Discovery Channel.

Series overview
{| class="wikitable plainrowheaders" style="text-align:center;"
|-
! colspan="2" rowspan="2" |Season
! rowspan="2" |Episodes
! colspan="2" |Originally aired
|-
! First aired
! Last aired
|-
 |style="background: #FF5F5F;"|
 |1
 |15
 |
 |
|-
 |style="background: #0000ff;"|
 |2
 |13
 |
 |
|-
 |style="background: #006600;"|
 |3
 |12
 |
 |
|-
 |style="background: #00bfff;"|
 |4
 |14
 |
 |
|-
 |style="background: #ff7f00;"|
 |5
 |7
 |
 |
|-
 |style="background: #813A94;"|
 |6
 |6
 |
 |
|-
 |style="background: #785028;"|
 |7
 |6
 |
 |
|}

Episodes

Season 1 (2006–2007)

Season 2 (2007–2008)

Season 3 (2008–2009)

Season 4 (2009–2010)

Season 5 (2010)

Season 6 (2011)

Season 7 (2011)

Special episodes

Notes

External links
 
 List of Man vs. Wild episodes at TV Guide
 List of Man vs. Wild episodes at Moviefone

Lists of reality television series episodes
Lists of American non-fiction television series episodes
Cultural depictions of Narendra Modi